Warrior Rock: Toyah on Tour is a live album by the English new wave band Toyah, fronted by Toyah Willcox, released in 1982 by Safari Records.

Background
The material was recorded on 17 and 18 July 1982 at London's Hammersmith Odeon at the end of the band's The Changeling UK tour. "Neon Womb" and "Street Creature", although performed during those shows, do not feature on the final album. There is no video counterpart to the audio recording as none of the concerts has been camera taped. The album was produced by Nick Tauber and the mixing took place at the Marquee Studios in London in August and September 1982.

The original double LP release of this album was the only Toyah record to be issued in a gatefold sleeve. It additionally contained an insert with Toyah's biographical discography. The album was released in early November 1982 and subsequently debuted and peaked at number 20 on the UK Albums Chart. It also reached number 1 on the UK Independent Albums Chart. Warrior Rock: Toyah on Tour was re-released in CD format in 2005.

Track listing
Side one
 "Good Morning Universe" (Toyah Willcox, Joel Bogen) – 5:03
 "Warrior Rock" (Willcox, Bogen, Phil Spalding) – 3:55
 "Danced" (Willcox, Bogen, Peter Bush) – 7:18
 "Jungles of Jupiter" (Willcox, Bogen, Spalding) – 6:23

Side two
"It's a Mystery" (Keith Hale) – 5:23
"Castaways" (Willcox, Bogen) – 5:20
"Angel & Me" (Willcox, Bogen) – 5:52
"Brave New World" (Willcox, Bogen) – 6:39

Side three
"The Packt" (Willcox, Bogen) – 7:05
"Thunder in the Mountains" (Willcox, Adrian Lee, Nigel Glockler) – 4:33
"We Are" (Willcox, Bogen) – 3:37
"I Want to Be Free" (Willcox, Bogen) – 6:38

Side four
"Dawn Chorus" (Willcox, Bogen, Spalding) – 5:13
"War Boys" (Willcox) – 6:04
"Ieya" (Willcox, Bogen, Bush) – 10:13

2005 CD edition contains abridged versions "War Boys" and "Ieya".

Personnel
 Toyah Willcox – vocals
 Joel Bogen – guitar, guitar synth, backing vocals
 Keith Hale – keyboards, backing vocals
 Phil Spalding – bass, backing vocals
 Simon Phillips – drums

Production
Nick Tauber – producer
Simon Hanhart – engineer
Barry Ainsworth, Andy Rose, Tim Wybrow – engineers
Phil Harding, John Eden – additional mixing
Mike Higgs, Andy Lovell, Mark Wade, Mike Duffy – mixing assistants

Charts

References

External links
 Warrior Rock: Toyah on Tour – official audio stream on YouTube
 The official Toyah website

Toyah (band) albums
1982 live albums
Albums recorded at the Hammersmith Apollo